Noel Schulz from Kansas State University, Manhattan, Kansas was named Fellow of the Institute of Electrical and Electronics Engineers (IEEE) in 2016 for leadership in advancing women in engineering and electric ship technologies.

References

Fellow Members of the IEEE
Living people
Year of birth missing (living people)
Place of birth missing (living people)
Kansas State University faculty
American electrical engineers